Iphiopsis is a genus of mites in the family Laelapidae.

Species
 Iphiopsis mirabilis (Berlese, 1882)

References

Laelapidae